Grégory González (born August 16, 1987) is an Ecuadorian footballer. He currently plays for Barcelona SC. A defender, he is a regular starter for his club.

Club career
González began his career as a professional footballer at Barcelona SC. The new head coach of Barcelona SC Benito Floro requested his presence for the motivated project called La Renovacion.

External links

1987 births
Living people
Sportspeople from Guayaquil
Association football defenders
Ecuadorian footballers
Barcelona S.C. footballers